Feng Shui is a 2004 Filipino supernatural horror film starring Kris Aquino. Co-written and directed by Chito S. Roño, it centres on a cursed Bagua mirror that brings death to those who stare it, with the circumstances of their death relating to their Chinese zodiac. Its screenplay was written by Roy Iglesias. The film grossed  and was the highest-grossing film of 2004 in the Philippines. The Hollywood version of the movie is still frozen and it is unknown if Star Cinema have decided to have a contract with Hollywood. A sequel, Feng Shui 2, was released on December 25, 2014, as the official entry to the 2014 Metro Manila Film Festival.

In 2022, Feng Shui was digitally restored and remastered for viewing on Netflix in Southeast Asia beginning October 14.

Plot

On a bus, Joy Ramirez  finds a package left by a passenger which contains a bagua mirror. Upon showing the mirror at Aling Biring's bakery, the latter tells her to keep the bagua and display to bring good luck to her household as per feng shui tradition.

Joy returns to her home and places the bagua mirror at their front door. A series of fortunate events happen: her friend Alice grants her a promotion and she wins a prize at a supermarket. The next day, Joy finds out on a newspaper that the man who left the mirror, identified as Evart Mendoza, was run over by a Rabbit Liner bus and discovers that he was born in the year of the Rabbit. Later, Joy learns that Aling Biring died from leptospirosis; her birth corresponding to the year of the Rat. On attending her wake, Joy finds Aling Biring's coffin empty as the latter appears in front of her momentarily before things go back to normal. Back home, Billy, a neighbor, tells Joy that suspicious events have been occurring in their neighborhood focusing on Joy's house. During a conversation with her son Denton, Joy sees a spirit resembling her regular tricycle driver Mang Nestor. The local security guards later inform her that Nestor was fatally stabbed in a cockfight brawl, having been born in the year of the Rooster. She is later haunted by the ghosts of Nestor, Biring, Evart, and an unknown woman. 

Joy visits Evart's widow Lily, who tells her about the bagua's history; Lily found the bagua in a house she sold as a real estate agent and kept it. The mirror brought her good luck as her business prospered, but for each stroke of luck, a death followed afterward, with her husband dying after he tried to dispose of the mirror. She urges Joy to return the mirror to her, but the latter refuses and leaves. Later, after Joy accepts an inheritance from a late client, her husband Inton and children discover the corpse of one of the local security guards, who looked into the bagua mirror earlier while checking Joy's house for suspicious activity. Upon closer inspection, it is found that he died from a snakebite; Joy later realizes that he was born on the year of the Snake.

Joy, along with Alice and their psychic friend Thelma, seeks help from a local geomancer Hsui Liao. He reveals that the bagua was once owned by a wealthy Chinese family in Shanghai during the Qing and Republican eras. During the Chinese Civil War, the family was forced to evacuate, leaving behind a foot-bounded member, nicknamed "Lotus Feet", referencing to the Chinese tradition of binding the feet of young girls to avert its physical growth. Her servants then joined the Chinese Communist Partyand burning her at the stake. As she perished, she took the bagua and placed a curse on it, taking the soul of anyone who sees their reflection on the mirror.

Alice then realizes that she had glanced at the mirror earlier. Having suspected her husband's affair with his former lover Dina, Joy confronts him. She later realizes after accepting her supermarket prize that Alice is the next victim. Alice, who was born in the year of the Horse, is assaulted by a drunk neighbor and dies after falling on a stack of crates of Red Horse Beer bottles from her window. The ghosts of the dead haunt Joy's house and her family is forced to flee. Joy attempts to destroy the mirror, but is stopped by Alice's spirit and subsequently passes out.

The next morning, Hsui Liao calls Joy and tells her that to end the curse, she must reject offers of good luck and then destroy the mirror. Just before they leave, Billy gets involved in an accident and Joy donates blood to save him. She then realizes that Inton is the next victim after accepting an offer from Billy's uncle to stay at a relative's condominium. Joy arrives at the motel where Inton and Dina are to warn them but arrives too late as Dina's husband Louie arrives and kills his wife and Inton, both born in the year of the Dog. As Joy pleads for her life, Louie shoots himself with his shotgun. Meanwhile, as Thelma drives Denton and his sister Ingrid to their mother, she sees a truck of livestock in front of her car. Upon asking the children, she realizes that Ingrid was born in the year of the Rooster, and Denton and herself were both born on the year of the Ox. Horrified, Thelma tries to evadethe truck but stumbles upon an oncoming vehicle speeds.

Joy arrives home and is met by Lily's lawyer, who is tasked to recover the bagua from Joy in exchange for money, but the latter firmly refuses. Distraught by preceding events, Joy finally destroys the mirror. Thelma arrives with Denton and Ingrid. Joy is relieved at ending the curse before realizing that they were all killed in the road accident, which happened after she was spared by Louie. Joy then sees Inton joining them as she screams in horror and the screen fades to black. 

Sometime later, a couple moves into a neighboring house as their twin daughters wander into Joy's former home, finding the restored bagua and bringing it home as Lotus Feet looks on from a window.

Cast

Main cast

Kris Aquino as Joy Ramirez
Jay Manalo as Inton Ramirez

Supporting cast

Lotlot de Leon as Alice
Ilonah Jean as Thelma
John Vladimir Manalo as Denton Ramirez
Julianne Gomez as Ingrid Ramirez
Ernesto Sto. Tomas as Billy
Cherry Pie Picache as Lily Mendoza
Nonie Buencamino as Louie
Jenny Miller as Dina
Gerard Pizzaras as Teodoro, Billy's uncle
Joonee Gamboa as Hsui Liao
Daria Ramirez as Inton's Mother
Archie Adamos as Tito
Emil Sandoval as Evart Mendoza
Luz Fernandez as Aling Biring
Leo Gamboa as Mang Nestor
Mon Confiado as Raul 
Denise Joaquin as Office mate
Jon Achaval as Mr. Mateo
Hazel Espinosa as Billy's aunt
Jenine Desiderio as Wife Neighbor
Froilan Sales as Husband Neighbor
Archie Ventosa as Atty. Regalado
Aloynius Noroña as Atty. Ocampo
Bianca Ito as Girl 1
Blanca Ate as Girl 2
Rosie Salco as Lotus Lady

Reception
The film was released at the time that 'Asian horror' gained popularity. It was a critical and commercial success, receiving positive reception from critics and audiences alike, and grossing ₱114,236,563 at the box-office making it the first local horror film to breach the 100 million pesos milestone at the box office. The film was the first in the line-up of box-office horror hit that Kris Aquino did under Star Cinema in which she was tagged as "Philippine's Box-office Horror Queen". It was followed by Sukob (also directed by Roño), Dalaw, and Segunda Mano.

Sequel

A sequel was confirmed by Kris Aquino, and the cast includes Coco Martin, Carmi Martin, Ian Veneracion, Beauty Gonzalez, Rez Cortez, Ian de Leon, Martin Escudero, Elizabeth Chua, Diana Zubiri, Francine Prieto, Pinky Marquez, Raikko Mateo, Kych Cyl Minemoto, Randy See, and Teodoro Baldomaro. Roño returned to direct the film. It served as Star Cinema's official entry to the 2014 Metro Manila Film Festival. The film focused on Coco Martin's character who, upon getting the cursed bagua, starts to get all the luck and prosperity he could get in his life, but with deadly consequences. Kris Aquino reprised her role as Joy Ramirez to save him from the curse. Filming of the film commenced by late August 2014.

Parodies
In the 2012 comedy film Sisterakas, the protagonist Bernice (played by Vice Ganda) hires Lotus Feet, who turns out to be a DVD vendor, to scare off her business rival Roselle (played by Kris Aquino), which leads to her falling down a stairwell. The film reused the scene where Lotus Feet was holding Alice's battered corpse in the original film.
In the 2014 comedy film The Amazing Praybeyt Benjamin, the titular character (played by Vice Ganda) uses a bagua mirror to distinguish Aquino's son Bimbee from a group of similar-looking children by seeing which of them will scream upon seeing the mirror. This may be coincidental since The Amazing Praybent Benjamin was part of 2014 Metro Manila Film Festival which included the film's sequel.

See also
 List of ghost films

References

External links
 

2004 films
2004 horror films
Filipino-language films
Films directed by Chito S. Roño
Philippine ghost films
Philippine supernatural horror films
Star Cinema films
Cockfighting in film